Gheorghe Lixandru (born 26 March 1953) is a Romanian bobsledder. He competed at the 1976, 1980 and the 1984 Winter Olympics.

References

1953 births
Living people
Romanian male bobsledders
Olympic bobsledders of Romania
Bobsledders at the 1976 Winter Olympics
Bobsledders at the 1980 Winter Olympics
Bobsledders at the 1984 Winter Olympics
Sportspeople from Bucharest